Joel Fredrick Dubina (born October 26, 1947) is an American attorney and jurist serving as a Senior United States circuit judge of the United States Court of Appeals for the Eleventh Circuit and a former United States District Judge of the United States District Court for the Middle District of Alabama.

Early life and education
Dubina was born in Elkhart, Indiana. He received a Bachelor of Science degree from the University of Alabama in 1970, and a Juris Doctor from Cumberland School of Law at Samford University in 1973. He was a law clerk to Judge Robert Edward Varner of the United States District Court for the Middle District of Alabama from 1973 to 1974.

Career 
Dubina worked in private practice of law in Montgomery, Alabama from 1974 to 1983.

Federal judicial service
Dubina was a United States magistrate judge for the Middle District of Alabama from 1983 to 1986. He was nominated by President Ronald Reagan on July 30, 1986, to Varner's seat on the United States District Court for the Middle District of Alabama. He was confirmed by the United States Senate on September 12, 1986, and received commission on September 15, 1986. His service was terminated on October 5, 1990, following his elevation to the United States Court of Appeals for the Eleventh Circuit.

Dubina was nominated to the Eleventh Circuit by President George H. W. Bush on June 7, 1990, to a seat vacated by Judge Robert Smith Vance. Dubina was confirmed by the Senate on September 28, 1990, and received his commission on October 1, 1990. He served as Chief Judge of the Eleventh Circuit from June 1, 2009, until July 31, 2013. Dubina had announced his intention to assume senior status, effective August 1, 2013, but waited until his 66th birthday on October 24, 2013.

In 2009 Dubina served as member of the three-judge panel which denied an "Application for Leave to File a Second or Successive Habeas Corpus Petition" in the Troy Davis case.

Dubina was on the 11th Circuit Court of Appeals panel that reviewed Roger Vinson's decision in Florida v. United States Department of Health and Human Services.

Personal life 
Dubina is married. His daughter, Martha Roby, became an attorney and a politician, first serving on the city council. She entered politics and was elected in 2010 to the United States House of Representatives from Alabama (AL-2) defeating incumbent congressman Bobby Bright. She has been re-elected to successive terms.

References

External links 
 

1947 births
Living people
20th-century American judges
Cumberland School of Law alumni
Judges of the United States Court of Appeals for the Eleventh Circuit
Judges of the United States District Court for the Middle District of Alabama
People from Elkhart, Indiana
Lawyers from Montgomery, Alabama
United States court of appeals judges appointed by George H. W. Bush
United States district court judges appointed by Ronald Reagan
United States magistrate judges
University of Alabama alumni
21st-century American judges